Merzxiu is a collaborative album by Japanese noise musician Merzbow and American art rock band Xiu Xiu. It was released exclusively for the Record Store Day on April 18, 2015 through Canadian record label Kingfisher Bluez. The initial run of the LP was limited to only 1000 copies.

Merzbow and Xiu Xiu previously collaborated live in 2010 at a show in (Le) Poisson Rouge in New York. During the recording of the release, both artists swapped music through e-mail and a translator. Jamie Stewart of Xiu Xiu described the tracks off the record as "death drone/extinction meditations... very slow, sonically violent and loud."

Track listing
 "Merzxiu A" — 19:52
 "Merzxiu B" — 17:33

Personnel

 Merzbow — performance, mixing
 Jamie Stewart (Xiu Xiu) — performance
 Ryan Dyck — typography
 Masahiro Takahashi

References

External links
 Merzxiu on Bandcamp
 

2015 albums
Merzbow albums
Xiu Xiu albums
Collaborative albums
Record Store Day releases